John Shostak (died January 27, 1971) was a Republican member of the Connecticut House of Representatives from Norwalk, Connecticut for four terms, and the mayor of Norwalk from 1959 to 1961.

Early life and family 
He was the son of Michael Shostak and Olga Leskewitch, and a graduate of the University of Connecticut College of Pharmacy.

Political career 
He served four terms as member of Connecticut House of Representatives. He was an alternate delegate to Republican National Convention from Connecticut in 1960. He served as mayor for one term, and declined to seek re-election for personal reasons. He ran for State Senator in 1966.

State Representative 
 Cities and Boroughs Committee
 State Development Committee
 Public Personnel Committee
 Federal and Intergovernmental Relations Committee
 Public Health and Safety Committee
 State Technical Institute Committee
 Industrial Safety Codes Committee

Mayoral administration 
 Norwalk Harbor Safety Patrol
 Cross Street Bridge
 Cloverleaf Bill
 Settled Teachers Strike

Associations 
 Director, Norwalk Heart Association
 Chairman, Heart Fund
 Director, United Fund County Chapter
 Chairman, National Conference of Christians and Jews
 Director, United Cerebral Palsy, Fairfield County
 President, Norwalk Exchange Club
 Chairman, Norwalk, Kiddies' Christmas Party
 Chairman, United Jewish Appeal Fund Drive
 Chairman, Community Fund Drive, Jewish Center
 Republican Party Fund Raiser
 Co-Chairman Red Cross Drive
 Chairman, Southwestern Regional Planning Group
 Advisory Committee, Norwalk Community College
 Chairman, Charter Revision Committee
 Executive Committee, Salk Institute Building Fund
 Director, Biddy League
 Founder, Babe Ruth League
 Sponsor, Pony League
 Pastime Social Club
 Norwalk Athletic Association
 University of Connecticut, College of Pharmacy
 Diplomate, American College of Apothecaries
 Connecticut Pharmaceutical Association
 American Pharmaceutical Association
 Kappa Psi, Pharmaceutical Fraternity
 Father's Club
 Elks
 Masons
 NAACP
 Circus Saints and Sinners
 member of branch 227 of Ukrainian National Association

Awards 
 Citation, American Legion Post 12, meritorious service
 Certificate, Catholic War Veterans, Cross of Peace Crusade
 Citizens Award, Jewish War Veterans
 Certificate, United Fund
 Special Award, YMCA
 Navy League of the US
 Ahepa Society

Legacy 
 The John Shostak Apartments public housing at 24½ Monroe Street

References 

1971 deaths
American people of Ukrainian-Jewish descent
American pharmacists
Mayors of Norwalk, Connecticut
Republican Party members of the Connecticut House of Representatives
University of Connecticut alumni
Year of birth missing